Maartje Krekelaar (born 6 July 1995) is a Dutch field hockey player.

Maartje Krekelaar (Veghel, July 6, 1995) is a Dutch hockey player. To date, Krekelaar played 43 international matches (11 goals) for the national women's team (reference date 1 August 2019) [1]. She won with Hockey Club 's-Hertogenbosch six times the national title in the period 2011-2019 (in 2013 and 2019 silver). Previously she played at Hockeyclub Uden. Krekelaar is playing as a midfielder for Hockey Club 's-Hertogenbosch since 2007.

Krekelaar was part of the Netherlands Junior National Team at the 2016 Junior World Cup where the team finished second, losing to Argentina in the final.

For the Dutch, Krekelaar made her debut during the 2015 Hockey World League final in Rosario (Argentina). In the first group match against Germany, Krekelaar scored the 0-1 for the Netherlands.

Krekelaar played the Woman's Hockey World League Final 2017, in Auckland (NZL), and won with the national women's teamgold and became top scorer of the tournament with 5 field goals.

Krekelaar is one of the ambassadors for Roparun and Foundation Pole Position

References

External links
 
 

1995 births
Living people
Dutch female field hockey players
People from Veghel
HC Den Bosch players
Sportspeople from North Brabant
21st-century Dutch women